The 25 cm schwerer Minenwerfer (heavy mine launcher), often abbreviated as 25 cm sMW, was a heavy mine shell launching trench mortar developed for the Imperial German Army in the first decade of the 20th century.

Design and development 
It was developed for use by engineer troops after the Siege of Port Arthur during the Russo-Japanese War of 1904–05 illustrated the usefulness of this class of weapon in destroying bunkers and fortifications immune to normal artillery. The 25 cm schwerer Minenwerfer was a muzzle-loading, rifled mortar that had a hydro-spring type recoil system. It fired either a  shell or a  mine shell; both containing far more explosive filler than ordinary artillery ammunition of the same caliber. The low muzzle velocity allowed for thinner shell walls, hence more space for filler for the same weight shell. The low velocity also allowed the use of explosives like ammonium nitrate–carbon that were less shock-resistant than TNT, which was in short supply. Shells filled with these substitutes nonetheless were the cause of many premature detonations, making the  riskier for the gun crew than normal artillery pieces.

Service 
Despite the extremely short range, the sMW proved to be potent as its massive shells were almost as effective in penetrating fortifications as the largest siege guns in the German inventory, including the  Dicke Bertha (Big Bertha), a howitzer that was more than 50 times the weight of the sMW. The value of the sMW is indicated by the number in service, which increased from 44 when the war broke out, to 1,234 at its end.

In 1916, a new longer barrelled version was put into production. This new model, which had a longer range, was named the 25 cm  (new pattern), which was abbreviated to 25 cm sMW n/A. The older, short-barrel model was then renamed 25 cm sMW a/A (old pattern).

Photo Gallery

See also 
 Minenwerfer

Comparable weapons 

 Mortier de 240 mm French equivalent
 9.45 inch Heavy Mortar British equivalent

References

External links 
 sMW on Landships II
 another sMW article on Landships

World War I mortars of Germany
250 mm artillery
Rheinmetall